Banak may refer to:

People
Łukasz Banak (born 1983), an amateur Polish Greco-Roman wrestler

Places

China
Banak Shöl Hotel, a historical hotel in Lhasa, Tibet

Iran
Banak, alternate name of the city of Bank, Iran
Banak, Fars, a village in Kerman Province, Iran
Banak, Kerman, a village in Kerman Province, Iran

Norway
Banak, Norway, a peninsula in Porsanger, Finnmark county, Norway
Lakselv Airport, Banak, an airport in Finnmark county, Norway
Station Group Banak, a military airbase in Finnmark county, Norway

Turkey
Banak Cathedral, a medieval Armeno-Georgian cathedral in Penek, Turkey

Other uses
Banak, a common name for the lobed river mullet from the Philippines